Schubiger is a surname. Notable people with the surname include:

Jürg Schubiger (1936–2014), Swiss psychotherapist and writer of children's books
Otto Schubiger (1925–2019), Swiss ice hockey player